Matthew Head is an umpire.

Matthew Head may also refer to:

A crime novel writer (pseudonym of art critic and historian John Canaday)
Mathew Head, rugby league player
Matthew Head (MP), for Canterbury